Naval Base Samoa, codename Operation Straw, was a number of United States Navy bases at American Samoa in the central Pacific Ocean. The bases were used during World War II to support the island hopping Pacific war efforts of the allied nations fighting the Empire of Japan.

History
The bases were in the Samoan Islands, the Samoan islands are divided in half at the International Date Line. The east half are the American Samoa islands and to the west are the Western Samoa part of British Samoa during the war. In 1942 the US Navy used American Samoa as a staging base for upcoming missions in the south pacific. Lieutenant General of the United States Marine Corps, Charles F. B. Price, arrived on 28 April 1942 and set up this Pacific war command at the city of Pago Pago. In the early part of the Pacific war on 11 January 1942, Pago Pago was shelled by a Japanese submarine I-20. Before the war, the Navy used Pago Pago harbor as a fueling station and a communication center. The center was part of the 1940 national defense program. In 1940 the center had a 300-foot wharf, a radio station, barracked, headquarters, shops, and motor pool, a power plant, water plant. On 1 July 1940 a Pacific Naval Air Bases contract was signed to improve the base at Samoa. The contract was for new fuel-oil, diesel, and gasoline tank farms. Also expansion of the station, an airbase, a dispensary, net depot, a new radio station, gun emplacements, bomb shelters, and ammunition depot. When Charles F. B. Price arrived he took over overseeing the construction started by civilian labor. US Navy Seabee 7th Construction Battalion arrived in July 1942 and worked was shifted from contractors to Seabees. The Seabee 11th Battalion arrived late in August 1942 and took over the work. The Seabee 5th Construction Detachment arrived in April 1943 to help complete all the projects. The Construction Battalion Maintenance Unit (CBMU) 506 arrived in May 1943 and the 11th Battalion departed for Naval Base New Caledonia. As the Pacific war moved east towards Japan, much of Naval Base Samoa was created and moved to US Naval Bases to the east in 1944. By 1945, Samoa remained a refueling station, emergency seaplane base, weather station, and communications center. Most of the bases were closed after the war. The station at Tutuila was the last base closed in 1951.

Major bases
United States Naval Station Tutuila, Fleet Post Office (FPO) #129 at Pago Pago Harbor, depot, repair (1921–1951)
Tafuna Airfield, used by the USN and USMC in the war, now Pago Pago International Airport, opened 6 April 1942
300-bed Naval Mobile Hospital 3
Destroyer repair base
Leone Airfield, emergency bomber 6,000-foot runway built in 1943 at 
Naval Base Upolu at Upolu Island, advanced Base (1942–1944) FPO#129
Upolu Seaplane Base
Faleolo Airbase
Palmyra Island Naval Air Station, advanced Base (1939–1947)
Naval Base Funafuti , Funafuti, Ellice Islands - Advanced base - Air Base, anchorage and small hospital

Minor bases
Naval Base at Uea on Wallis Island, a French Protectorate, the most west of the Samoa Islands. FPO# 207, US Navy set up a Landing Craft repair Base on the island's Mata Utu Harbor, also a fuel tank farm.
Naval Base at Savaii Island, main Samoa Island. FPO# 209, Marines arrived 30 May 1942 and set up a temp tent camp, codenamed Strawmanand later renamed Trap and then Lapover.
Blunts Point Battery built in 1940

Stations
Base at Ofu-Olosega, Radio Station, FPO# 67
Base at Swains Island, Radio Station, FPO# 68
Base at Tau Islands, Radio Station, FPO# 60
Base at Vaitogi, radio direction finder Station, FPO# 70
On Atafu Island, in the Tokelau Islands, to the north of Samoa, the United States Coast Guard built and operated a LORAN station from 1944 to 1946.
On Gardner Island, in the Phoenix Islands, to the north of Samoa, the United States Coast Guard built and operated a LORAN station from 1944 to 1946.

Supported airfields
Naval Base Samoa and Naval Base Fiji supported three airfields to the north:
Naval Base to support Nanumea Airfield  at Nanumea, Ellice Islands, closed 1945
Naval Base to support Nukufetau Airfield at Nukufetau, Ellice Islands, closed 1945
Naval Base Canton Island to support Airfield in the Phoenix Islands, closed 1945
 To the east, Cook Islands: 
Robinson (Omoka) Field, Camp Durant and Naval Seaplan Base Penrhyn on Penrhyn Island
Amuri Field, Aitutaki Island, Aitutaki Station Naval Hospital

Seabees

Seabees had the men and equipment to build airfields and sea bases. At the base, Seabees built a camp for the crews and a depot for the supplies they need for the project. Seabees often worked in shifts around the clock to open airfields as quickly as possible. On a project was completed they move to the next project.

Post war
The Museum of Samoa at Apia.

Gallery

See also

US Naval Advance Bases
 List of governors of American Samoa
 National Register of Historic Places listings in American Samoa
 Naval Base Panama Canal Zone

References

External links
 American Samoa Military Bases website

Military in American Samoa
Buildings and structures in American Samoa
Naval Stations of the United States Navy
Closed installations of the United States Navy
20th century in American Samoa
1940 establishments in Oceania
1944 disestablishments in Oceania
Military installations established in 1940
Military installations closed in 1944